On October 28, 2016, FedEx Express Flight 910, a McDonnell Douglas MD-10-10F flying from Memphis International Airport to Fort Lauderdale–Hollywood International Airport was involved in a runway skid after a landing gear collapse, which resulted in a fire completely destroying the left engine and wing. Two crew members, the only people on board, were unharmed.

On the same day, American Airlines Flight 383 aborted takeoff after it suffered an engine fire at Chicago O'Hare International Airport. Everyone survived, with 21 passengers injured.

Aircraft and crew 

The aircraft was a McDonnell Douglas MD-10-10F airliner, built in 1972 as a DC-10 passenger aircraft, was first delivered to United Airlines and operated until 1997. It was later converted to cargo configuration, delivered to FedEx in August 1997 and upgraded to an MD-10 in 2003. The aircraft was powered by three General Electric CF6-6D engines and was 44 years old at the time of the accident.

The captain, 55, was hired as a flight engineer by FedEx in 2000. He had previously served with the U.S. Air Force from 1982 to 2000 as a veteran of the Gulf War, Bosnian War and Kosovo War. At the company, he worked on the Boeing 727 as a flight engineer, a first officer, and a captain, as well as a captain on the MD-11. He had a total flight time of about 10,000 hours (he was uncertain about his time as pilot-in-command) and estimated about 1,500 hours in the MD-11.

The first officer, 47, was hired as a flight instructor by FedEx in 2004. He also previously served with the U.S. Air Force from 1989 to 2004 as a veteran of the Gulf War, Bosnian War and Kosovo War. In 2007, he became a flight engineer in the Boeing 727 and became a first officer in the MD-11 in 2012. He estimated a total flight time of 6,000 to 6,300 hours, with about 4,000 hours as pilot-in-command. He estimated a total time of about 400 to 500 hours in the MD-11.

Accident 
FedEx 910 landed on Fort Lauderdale's runway 10L at 17:50 local time (21:50Z). The tower reported the left side CF6 engine appeared on fire. The aircraft came to a stop about  down the runway and beyond the left edge with the left main gear collapsed and the left wing on fire. The airport closed all runways while emergency services responded to put the fire out. The two crew members had no injuries, but the aircraft received substantial damage. The National Transportation Safety Board (NTSB) dispatched five investigators on site and opened an investigation.

On October 31, the NTSB reported that the left main gear failed after landing and during rollout. The left engine and left wing scraped the runway and the aircraft veered to the left and came to a stop partially off the runway. Both flight crew members escaped through the right cockpit window using an escape rope. No injuries were reported. Cockpit voice and flight data recorders were taken to the NTSB lab in Washington for analysis. Following an examination of the runway, the NTSB returned control of the runway to the Fort Lauderdale Airport.

Investigation 
On August 23, 2018 the NTSB reported that "the failure of the left main gear was the result of a metal fatigue crack that initiated within the gear," and cited FedEx's failure to overhaul the gear at the manufacturer-recommended eight-year interval as a contributor to the crash.

See also 
 Similar accidents
 FedEx Express Flight 630
 FedEx Express Flight 14
 FedEx Express Flight 647
 FedEx Express Flight 80
 China Airlines Flight 642
 Peruvian Airlines Flight 112
 Continental Airlines Flight 603

References

External links 
 National Transportation Safety Board
 Cockpit Voice Recorder transcript
 Flight Data Recorder readout
 Maintenance records

Aviation accidents and incidents in the United States in 2016
2016 in Florida
910
Airliner accidents and incidents in Florida
Accidents and incidents involving the McDonnell Douglas DC-10
October 2016 events in the United States
Fort Lauderdale–Hollywood International Airport